Allan Johns (born 13 June 1925) was an Australian soccer player who played for Adamstown Rosebud. Johns played 10 full international matches for Australia.

References

1925 births
Possibly living people
Australia international soccer players
Adamstown Rosebud FC players
Australian soccer players
Association footballers not categorized by position